Nurses is a Canadian drama television series that premiered on Global on January 6, 2020. Nurses was created by much of the same team behind the series Rookie Blue, including Ilana Frank, Adam Pettle, Vanessa Piazza and Tassie Cameron. The series was renewed for a second season by Global in early 2020.

NBC ran the first season in the United States beginning on December 7, 2020, due to the shortage of programs during the lockdowns from the COVID-19 pandemic in the United States, but did not pick up the second season.

Premise
The series centers on a group of nurses at a busy downtown Toronto hospital.

Cast and characters

Main

 Tiera Skovbye as Grace Knight
 Natasha Calis as Ashley Collins
 Jordan Johnson-Hinds as Keon Colby
 Sandy Sidhu as Nazneen Khan
 Donald Maclean Jr. as Wolf Burke

Recurring

 Cathy White as Sinead O'Rourke
 Ryan-James Hatanaka as Dr. Evan Wallace
 Tristan D. Lalla as Damien Sanders
 Nicola Correia-Damude as Dr. Vanessa Banks
 Raymond Ablack as Kabir Pavan
 Alexandra Ordolis as Caro
 Trish Fagan as Dr. Rori Niven
 Peter Stebbings as Dr. Thomas Hamilton
 Ryan Blakely as Red
 Jordan Connor as Matteo Rey
 Rachael Ancheril as Kate Faulkner
 Katie Uhlmann as Candy Kemper
 Matt Gordon as Dr. Mike Goldwyn
 Humberly González as Dr. Ivy Turcotte

Production
The series is produced by Corus Entertainment, which partnered with ICF Films and eOne in association with Piazza Entertainment. It was renewed for a second season by Global, which went into production in March 2020. As of October 2022, there has yet to be an announcement for a third season.

Episodes

Series overview

Season 1 (2020)

Season 2 (2021)

Broadcast
The series premiered on January 6, 2020, on Global in Canada.

From May 2020, the series was broadcast by Net5 in the Netherlands.

On November 10, 2020, Nurses was picked up by NBC in the United States for a December 7, 2020 premiere.

The series debuted in Romania on the channel Diva on September 20, 2020, under the title "Asistenți medicali".

The series is scheduled to premiere in September 2021 exclusively on Globoplay in Brazil.

Controversy over "Achilles Heel" episode 
The show's portrayal of Hasidic Jews in a plotline of the "Achilles Heel" episode was labeled as antisemitic by members of the Jewish community. In the episode, when the Hasidic Jewish patient is checked in for his leg injury, the patient's father objects to who the dead donor's bone graft might come from (along with his son participating in sports, in an extreme portrayal of a Hasidic archetype) and says "a goyim leg. From anyone. An Arab, a woman?" The patient then refuses the bone graft procedure. In reality, Jewish law has no objections or prohibitions against such a procedure.

Seffi Kogen of the American Jewish Committee called the scene 'the most antisemitic thing I have ever seen in a TV show", and that Jewish law "puts precedent on healing and saving lives [and] there is no prohibition on the kind of bone graft in this clip." B’nai Brith Canada said the portrayal "perpetuates false and dangerous antisemitic stereotypes" and called for the producers to apologize. The Simon Wiesenthal Center said in a statement, "the writers of this scene check all the boxes of ignorance and pernicious negative stereotypes" and that "Orthodox Jews are targeted for violent hate crimes – in the city of New York, Jews are number one target of hate crimes in US; this is no slip of the tongue. It was a vile, cheap attack masquerading as TV drama."

In response, NBC pulled the episode from their digital platforms. The episode was also removed domestically in Canada by Global parent company Corus from Global's website and viewing apps, with no plans to air it in repeats in the future.

References

External links
 
 
 Nurses at NBC
  Nurses at epguides

2020 Canadian television series debuts
2021 Canadian television series endings
2020s Canadian drama television series
2020s Canadian LGBT-related drama television series
2020s Canadian medical television series
English-language television shows
Lesbian-related television shows
Television shows filmed in Toronto
Television shows set in Toronto
Global Television Network original programming
Television series by Entertainment One
Television series by Corus Entertainment
Works about nursing